T-Slam (also Tislam, Hebrew: תיסלם) was an influential Israeli rock band, founded in 1980 by Dani Bassan, Izhar Ashdot and Yair Nitzani. The band dissolved on October 23, 1983, but has reunited at least three times since then.

History
T-Slam began in 1980 with the collaboration of Danni Bassan (vocalist), Izhar Ashdot (guitarist) and Yair Nitzani (keyboardist). In 1981, with the addition of another guitarist, Yoshi Sadeh, the band recorded its first song, "Tnu Li Rokenrol" ("Give Me Rock N' Roll"), in the Israeli Army Radio studios, and released their first album, Radio Hazak ("Loud Radio"), titled after their hit single.

They released their second album, T-Slam2 (תיסלם2), a year after, having enlarged their band with drummer Sami Avzardel and bassist Tzuf Philosof. Their last album, LeAsfanim Bilvad ("For Collectors Only"), was released in 1983; it included newer versions for some of their songs, covers for other bands, and a few songs made with the band Benzin.

On October 23, 1983, after a gig in Beer Sheba, the band announced that that was their last show, and that they did not intend to work on new songs.

Post-disbandment era
After the band dissolved, the six members started solo careers. Danny Bassan released three solo albums, Tsoof Philosof became a top session bass player and a member of the Local Band, Yoshi Sadeh spent a few years working in America, and Sammy Avzardel had his own working band. Yair Nitzani joined one of Israel's biggest record companies, Hed Arzi, and ended up managing it. Nitzani and Izhar Ashdot, who became a top record producer, were both responsible for Ofra Haza's 1988 European no. 1 single, "Im Nin'alu". Izhar started his successful solo career in 1992.

In the summer of 1990, T-Slam produced a comeback tour, which filled stadiums all over Israel. The band recorded two new songs and released a compilation album, Nagnu Achshav ("Play Now"), which went platinum.

In 1994, the band performed at the opening of the Hard Rock Cafe in Tel Aviv. A video news item reporting the show was added as one of the special bonuses on the live DVD released in 2003.

In March 2002, following rumors in the media, T-Slam played at the Barbi Club in Tel Aviv under the name Gold Fingers.
The evening's success, together with the demand for further concerts and the great fun the guys had playing together, led T-Slam to start a tour that culminated in a show January 2003 at Tel Aviv Hangar with guest artists Muki, Monica Sex and Israeli rapper Subliminal. The live show was recorded and was released as a double CD and DVD named Or Shel Kokhavim ("Star Light").

On September 14, 2006, the band played a one-off reunion show with Rami Fortis and Berry Sakharof in Jerusalem.

On 28th February 2023 the band played together with the Israeli Philharmonic Orchestra to a packed crowd at the Charles Bronfman auditorium in Tel Aviv, the largest concert hall in Israel.

Band members
 Danni Bassan - lead vocals, percussion
 Izhar Ashdot - guitars, vocals
 Yoshi Sadeh - guitars, vocals
 Yair Nitzani - keyboards, backing vocals
 Tzuf Philosof - bass guitar, backing vocals
 Sami Avzardel - drums, percussion.

Discography
 1981: Radio Hazak (Loud Radio, רדיו חזק)
 1982: Tislam2 (T-Slam2, תיסלם2)
 1983: LeAsfanim Bilvad (For Collectors Only, לאספנים בלבד)
 1990: Nagnu Achshav (Play Now, נגנו עכשיו)
 2003: Or Shel Kohavim (Light of the Stars, אור של כוכבים)
 2015: T-Slam and the Israel Symphony Orchestra Rishon Lezion (תיסלם והסימפונית הישראלית ראשון לציון)

Israeli rock music groups